Éva Vantara-Kelemen (born 27 December 1987 in Szeghalom) is a Hungarian handballer who plays for Debreceni VSC as a left winger. She has also been selected for the Hungary women's national handball team

Achievements
Magyar Kupa:
Silver Medalist: 2012
Bronze Medalist: 2010

External links
 Éva Kelemen player profile on Békéscsabai Előre NKSE Official Website
 Éva Kelemen career statistics at Worldhandball

References

1987 births
Living people
People from Szeghalom
Hungarian female handball players
Békéscsabai Előre NKSE players
Sportspeople from Békés County